The 2013 season is the 102nd season in the history of Sport Club Corinthians Paulista.

In this season, they have competed on the Campeonato Paulista, winning it for a 27th time, and in the Copa Libertadores, being eliminated at the round of 16. Won the Recopa Sudamericana after defeating São Paulo. Was eliminated in the quarter-finals of the Copa do Brasil. Finished 10th in the Campeonato Brasileiro Série A.

In November, Corinthians has announced it would not renew with Tite.

Players

First team squad
As of 20 October 2013

Out on Loan

Competitions

Overview

Campeonato Paulista

First stage

Quarter-finals

Semi-finals

Final

Copa Libertadores

Group 5

Knockout stages

Round of 16

Recopa Sudamericana

Results

Copa do Brasil

Round of 16

Quarter-finals

References

Sport Club Corinthians Paulista seasons
Corinthians